Anthony Horace Millington (5 June 1943 – 5 August 2015) was a Welsh footballer who played as a goalkeeper for West Bromwich Albion, Crystal Palace, Peterborough United and Swansea City in the 1960s and 1970s and made 21 international appearances for Wales. His career ended in 1975 following a car accident and he later became the disability officer at Wrexham A.F.C. He was the brother of Grenville Millington, who played in goal for Rhyl and Chester.

Football career

Club career
Millington was born in Hawarden, Flintshire, and played football for his school side and represented his county. After playing for various local clubs, he joined West Bromwich Albion as a trainee in July 1959.

He made his first-team debut for Albion on 30 September 1961, taking over from Ray Potter in a 2–2 draw at home to Manchester City. He retained the goalkeeper's jersey for the remainder of the 1961–62 season but the following year he and Potter "shared" the jersey. His final game for the "Baggies" came on 16 March 1963 at Molineux, when he played in the absence of the injured Potter against Wolverhampton Wanderers, conceding seven goals. Millington spent the next 18 months in the reserves before he was transferred to Crystal Palace in October 1964.

After two seasons at Selhurst Park, Millington was sold to Peterborough United in March 1966 along with Derek Kevan for a combined fee of £15,000. At Peterborough, he replaced Willie Duff, making his debut on 1 October 1966 in a 5–2 defeat at Brighton & Hove Albion. He soon became established as the first choice goalkeeper and made 118 league appearances over three years before moving to Wales to join Swansea Town for a £5,000 fee in July 1969.

Millington was a "key figure" as Swansea gained promotion from the Fourth Division in 1970. In January 1971, Swansea (now "City") met Rhyl in the Third Round of the FA Cup; in goal for Rhyl was Millington's younger brother, Grenville. The match ended 6–1 in favour of Swansea, who then went on to meet Liverpool in the next round, going down 3–0.

By 1973, Millington was out of favour with Swansea's manager Harry Gregg, who brought in a succession of goalkeepers on loan, the most successful being Jimmy Rimmer from Manchester United.

In 1974 Millington moved to Northern Ireland to manage his father's pub business. He signed for Newry Town F.C. and played four times in the B Division George Wilson Cup before transferring to Irish senior side Glenavon.

Whilst playing for Newry he took and scored a penalty against Omagh Town in a 5-1 victory at Newry Showgrounds.

International career
Millington made his international debut when he took the place of Newcastle United's David Hollins for the British Home Championship match against Scotland at Ninian Park on 20 October 1962. Despite "doing well", Millington conceded three goals with Wales only scoring twice in reply. He retained his shirt for the next two matches, against Hungary and England, both of which ended in defeats.

Throughout his international career, Millington was generally the second-choice keeper firstly behind Hollins and then Gary Sprake of Leeds United. On 30 May 1965, he replaced Hollins, who was suffering from food poisoning, in a World Cup qualifying match at Moscow's Central Lenin Stadium against the Soviet Union. Wales went down 2–1, with Graham Williams turning the ball past Millington for the hosts' second goal, thus destroying Wales's hopes of qualifying.

International appearances
Millington made 21 appearances for Wales in official international matches, as follows:

Personality
Described as a "brave goalkeeper (who was) full of agility, had a safe pair of hands and a useful kick", Millington was also a "showman" who "saw himself as an entertainer" whose maxim was that "if something couldn't be done with spectacular style, it wasn't worth doing at all". Often he would make a save with a "spectacular" dive, rather than something simpler.

"Milly", as he was known, was popular with the fans who saw him as "a one-man entertainment". During quiet periods in a match, he would leave his goal and "cadge sweets from children" in the crowd or take and eat a pie from supporters. Being superstitious, he was unable to watch penalty kicks being taken at the far end of the pitch and would kneel in the goalmouth with his back to the action. When his team scored a goal, he would often celebrate with a handstand in his penalty area.

Legend has it that during his time at Swansea:Warming up before the game, he suddenly chased off the field only to return carrying a chair. He'd spotted an elderly supporter on crutches in the crowd and ushered him into the disabled supporters' enclosure and sat him down to watch the game.

An old Swans fan once reported that one of Tony's party-pieces to entertain kids behind the goal was to swing on the crossbar monkey-style. He stopped doing this when this distraction caused him to miss a back pass and conceded an own goal.

Later career and death
Millington left the Football League in the summer of 1974 and moved to Northern Ireland to work in his father-in-law's business, turning out occasionally for Glenavon. His football career was ended by a car crash in 1975; his injuries resulted in him requiring a wheelchair and in need of constant care. He settled in Wrexham where he helped found a club for Wrexham Football Club's disabled supporters, going on to become the football club's disability officer. He died on 5 August 2015 at the age of 72.

Honours
Wales
British Home Championship joint winners: 1969–70

References

External links

1943 births
2015 deaths
People from Hawarden
Sportspeople from Flintshire
Welsh footballers
Association football goalkeepers
Wales under-23 international footballers
Wales international footballers
Connah's Quay Nomads F.C. players
Sutton Town A.F.C. players
West Bromwich Albion F.C. players
Crystal Palace F.C. players
Peterborough United F.C. players
Swansea City A.F.C. players
Glenavon F.C. players